Cobdogla is a town in the Riverland region of South Australia, The town is on the Murray River,  north-east of the state capital, Adelaide. At the 2006 census, Cobdogla had a population of 232.

Cobdogla is the home of the Irrigation and Steam Museum, centred on a pair of Humphrey pumps, one of which is operable, and boasts a working 3 km railway with both a diesel and a steam locomotive (originally used by Humes Ltd. to transport pipes for the Loveday pipeline), a traction engine and numerous stationary engines, all in working order, maintained and operated by enthusiasts, as well as static displays on various river topics – Village Settlements, Loveday Internment Camp and Irrigation maintained by the National Trust of South Australia. Open days are infrequent as a great deal of (voluntary) labour is involved.

The historic Cobdogla Homestead Ruins and the Humphrey pumps at the former Cobdogla Pumping Station are listed on the South Australian Heritage Register.

Notes

References

External links
Cobdogla Steam Museum website
National Trust

Towns in South Australia
Populated places on the Murray River
Riverland